Josh Arieh (born September 26, 1974 in Rochester, New York) is an American professional poker player. Arieh has been competing in poker competitions since 1999.

Tournament history 
Arieh finished in third place in the 2004 World Series of Poker (WSOP) Main Event and has a World Series of Poker title in Limit Texas hold 'em in 1999 and a 2nd-place finish at the 2000 World Series of Poker Pot Limit Omaha event to Johnny Chan. At the 2005 World Series of Poker, he won his second bracelet by defeating Chris Ferguson in a Pot Limit Omaha event. Arieh finished 2nd in the 2014 World Series of Poker $5,000 No Limit Hold'em - Eight Handed (Event #35). 

As of 2021 Arieh is one of only three people to have finished 3rd place or better in the World Series of Poker Main Event, as well as finish 2nd place or better in the $50,000 buyin The Poker Players Championship W.S.O.P. event. The only other two players to do so in both events, are Poker Hall of Famers: Scotty Nguyen, and Phil Hellmuth. 

Through the 2021 World Series of Poker, Josh Arieh has won 4 World Series of Poker bracelets, 3 of which he won in 3 different decades, he has finished runner up in 3 different W.S.O.P. events, and he has made it to 19 World Series of Poker final tables. He has also finished 10th place or better, in several different game modes/game structures offered in the current W.S.O.P. schedule. For instance: Limit 2-7 Triple Draw, 8-game, Limit Hold'em, Pot Limit Omaha, Dealer's Choice (which is open to 20 different poker games at any given time), No Limit Hold'em, Limit Omaha/Stud Hi/Lo 8 or better, Pot Limit Omaha Hi/Lo 8 or better. 

At 2021 World Series of Poker, Arieh bested out 2nd place finisher Phil Hellmuth to earn the WSOP Player of the Year honors. This was quite an impressive feat, especially considering the fact that Phil Hellmuth set the record for most final tables reached in a single World Series Poker in 2021. 

Arieh has made 2 final tables on the World Poker Tour. He also has several other tournament victories and final table television appearances.

As of 2021, his total live tournament winnings exceed $9,232,000.

Personality 
Arieh has the reputation as something of a divisive figure, often relying on verbal bullying when trying to force a hand. He has earned the friendship and respect of many of his competitors, but has also committed several faux pas during his career, lambasting Harry Demetriou after an important hand in the Main Event of the 2004 World Series of Poker and, after being eliminated from that tournament, pulling one of the remaining players (David Williams) aside and whispering, "bust this motherfucker," referring to the other remaining opponent, eventual champion Greg Raymer. He subsequently apologized after both incidents.

Arieh is friends with former professional baseball player John Smoltz. Arieh was Smoltz's caddy when Smoltz attempted to qualify for the U.S. Open Championship in 2010.

World Series of Poker bracelets

Notes

External links
World Poker Tour profile
Feature article in American Jewish Life Magazine

1974 births
20th-century American Jews
American poker players
World Series of Poker bracelet winners
Living people
Sportspeople from Rochester, New York
People from Atlanta
21st-century American Jews